Santa Singh may refer to:

Santa Singh (field hockey) (born 1996), Indian field hockey player
Jathedar Santa Singh (1928–2008), Nihang and 13th Jathedar of Budha Dal
Santa Singh (joke), a class of ethnic jokes based on stereotypes of Sikhs